Rhipsalidopsis is a small genus of flowering plant in the family Cactaceae, native to southern Brazil. Like other members of the tribe Rhipsalideae, its species are epiphytes, growing on trees.

Taxonomy

The genus Rhipsalidopsis was established by Nathaniel Lord Britton and Joseph Nelson Rose in 1923. The generic name means 'like Rhipsalis'. They transferred one species from Rhipsalis to their new genus as Rhipsalidopsis rosea. The presence of a short tube at the base of the flower where the petals were fused was regarded as one of the diagnostic features. The taxonomy of genera like Rhipsalidopsis that are placed in the tribe Rhipsalideae was described as confused by Anderson in 2001, with species moved among Rhipsalis, Hatiora and Schlumbergera in particular. A molecular phylogenetic study in 2011 showed that two species then placed in Hatiora were separate from other species in the genus and could be placed in an expanded Schlumbergera. Others placed them in a revived genus Rhipsalidopsis.

Species
, Plants of the World Online accepted the following species:
Rhipsalidopsis gaertneri (Regel) Linding.
Rhipsalidopsis rosea (Lagerh.) Britton & Rose
An artificial hybrid between these two species is also known:
Rhipsalidopsis × graeseri (Barthlott ex D.R.Hunt) P.V.Heath

References

Rhipsalideae
Cactoideae genera